Cinda A. Hallman (1944–2007) became noteworthy for her work in Y2K prior to coining the phrase "outsource the outsourcing process;" both of these were at Du Pont, prior to her nomination to The Research Board.

Biography
Arkansas-born Hallman began her career at Conoco in 1966 where she was hired as a systems analyst directly after graduating from Southern Arkansas University.

Du Pont
Conoco was acquired by Du Pont in 1981. In 1988 Hallman moved to the parent company,
and advanced to CIO in 1992. By 1999 she held a senior vice president title, the company's first female vice president .

Spherion
Hallman joined Spherion in 2001 as Chief Executive Officer, retiring in 2004. She died December 2007, at age 63, of an illness.

She had been a member of Spherion's board of directors since early 1995. Hallman replaced Raymond Marcy as Chief Executive Officer in 2001, a role that Marcy had held for over a decade, during which time Spherion acquired a rival, Norrell Corp.

Spherion's prior name was Interim Services.

Outsourcing
Hallman made a mark in the area of major multi-billion dollar outsourcing.

Board memberships
Among the boards of directors on which she served were "Toys "R" Us, Catalyst, United Way of America and Christiana Care Health Systems."

Legacy
Beyond having pioneered in what later became known as midsourcing (and receiving various awards), Hallman's alma mater wrote about serving as "an inspiration for young women as she met the challenges of corporate leadership and succeeded at the highest levels."

Personal
Five–foot–six Cinda Hallman is "the elder ... (to) fraternal .. twin sister Linda." Their father died in an accident when they were age 15.

Notes

References

External links
 Photo, Cinda Hallman
 Photo, Cinda Hallman

1944 births
2007 deaths
American women business executives
American women chief executives
20th-century American women
20th-century American people
21st-century American women